George Fox (born October 6, 1974), better known as Huckleberry Fox, is an American actor who performed in Terms of Endearment (1983) Misunderstood (1984) and the Disney film The Blue Yonder (1985). He played Jamie in Tales from the Darkside The Cutty Black Sow (1988) series 4, episode 14.

References

Bibliography
 Holmstrom, John. The Moving Picture Boy: An International Encyclopaedia from 1895 to 1995. Norwich, Michael Russell, 1996, p. 394.

External links
 Huckleberry Fox at imdb.com

Living people
1974 births
American male film actors